Flatbush Avenue is a street in Brooklyn, New York.

Flatbush Avenue may also refer to:

Stations
 Flatbush Avenue (BMT Fulton Street Line), in Brooklyn, New York, United States
 Flatbush Avenue–Brooklyn College (IRT Nostrand Avenue Line), in Brooklyn, New York, United States
 Flatbush Avenue (LIRR station), in Brooklyn, New York, United States
 Flatbush Avenue station (Connecticut), in West Hartford, Connecticut, United States

Transportation routes
 Flatbush Avenue Connector, in Connecticut
 IRT Flatbush Avenue Line, another name for IRT Nostrand Avenue Line, in Brooklyn, New York, United States
 Flatbush Avenue Line (surface), in Brooklyn, New York, United States

See also
 Flatbush Avenue Line (disambiguation)